Natalya Vladimirovna Popkova (born 21 September 1988) is a Russian long-distance runner.

International competitions

References

1988 births
Living people
Russian female long-distance runners
Universiade medalists in athletics (track and field)
Universiade bronze medalists for Russia
Medalists at the 2011 Summer Universiade
World Athletics Championships athletes for Russia
Russian Athletics Championships winners
20th-century Russian women
21st-century Russian women